Klaus Barthel (born 28 December 1955 in Munich) is a German politician of the SPD who served as a member of the Bundestag from 1994 until 2017.

External links 
  

1955 births
Living people
Politicians from Munich
Members of the Bundestag for Bavaria
Members of the Bundestag 2013–2017
Members of the Bundestag 2009–2013
Members of the Bundestag 2005–2009
Members of the Bundestag 2002–2005
Members of the Bundestag 1998–2002
Members of the Bundestag 1994–1998
Members of the Bundestag for the Social Democratic Party of Germany